Malye Derbety (Bağ Dörvd) is a rural locality (a selo) and the administrative center of Maloderbetovsky District in the Republic of Kalmykia, Russia. Population: 

Malye Derbety was the birthplace of Velimir Khlebnikov.

References

Rural localities in Kalmykia
Maloderbetovsky District